Kochenga is a rural locality (a village) in Medvedevskoye Rural Settlement, Totemsky  District, Vologda Oblast, Russia. The population was 37 as of 2002.

Geography 
Kochenga is located 54 km northeast of Totma (the district's administrative centre) by road.

References 

Rural localities in Tarnogsky District